The 2017 international cricket season was from May 2017 to September 2017. 13 Test matches, 52 One-day Internationals (ODIs), 12 Twenty20 Internationals (T20Is), and 31 Women's One Day Internationals (WODIs) were played during this period. The season started with India leading the Test cricket rankings, South Africa leading the ODI rankings, New Zealand leading the Twenty20 rankings, and Australia women leading the Women's rankings.

The season started with a two match ODI series between England and Ireland, followed by a tri-nation ODI series in Ireland (also containing New Zealand and Bangladesh), and a three match ODI series between England and South Africa. These matches served as preparation for the ICC Champions Trophy, which was held in England in June. This was the first Champions Trophy that the West Indies did not participate in, due to them having been outside the top 8 in the ODI rankings on the cut-off date of 30 September 2015. This was immediately followed by the Women's Cricket World Cup, which was also held in England. After these two major events, international cricket resumed with many bilateral series that occurred during the rest of the season including Afghanistan's first ever bilateral tour to the West Indies. Important series included the 6th edition of the Basil D'Oliveira Trophy and the 26th edition of the Wisden Trophy, the latter of which included the first day/night Test match to be played in England. Pakistan were scheduled to tour Bangladesh in July, but the series was cancelled. The season also included Zimbabwe's first bilateral tour of Sri Lanka in 15 years, with Zimbabwe recording their first series win over Sri Lanka.

During the season, many important steps of 2019 ICC Cricket World Cup qualification process took place. ODIs between the 12 teams competing in the ICC ODI Championship were of special importance as only those that are ranked in the top 8 at the end of this season (30 September 2017) qualified directly for the World Cup. This was different from previous World Cups, as Full Members were granted automatic qualification in those tournaments. Those ranked in the bottom four will compete in the 2018 Cricket World Cup Qualifier and will be joined by the top four teams in the World Cricket League Championship and the top two teams from World Cricket League Division Two. Matches in rounds 5 and 6 of the World Cricket League Championship and the Intercontinental Cup took place during this season. The World Cricket League Division Three tournament were also held in this season, with the top 2 teams, Oman and Canada, being promoted to Division 2.

Pakistan were also scheduled to tour Bangladesh in July 2017, to play two Test, three ODIs and a T20I match. However, in April 2017, the tour was cancelled.

Season overview

Rankings

The following are the rankings at the beginning of the season:

May

Ireland in England

2017 South Africa Women's Quadrangular Series

2017 Ireland Tri-Nation Series

2017 ICC World Cricket League Division Three

Final standings

South Africa in England

June

2017 ICC Champions Trophy

Afghanistan in West Indies

Namibia in Scotland

Zimbabwe in Scotland

Zimbabwe in Netherlands

India in West Indies

2017 Women's Cricket World Cup

Zimbabwe in Sri Lanka

July

United Arab Emirates in Netherlands

India in Sri Lanka

2017 South Africa A Team Tri-Series

August

Netherlands in Ireland

West Indies in England

Australia in Bangladesh

September

2017 ICC World Cricket League Division Five

Final standings

2017 Independence Cup

West Indies in Ireland

United Arab Emirates in Namibia

References

2017 in cricket